Richardson Fernandes dos Santos (born 17 August 1991), simply known as Richardson is a Brazilian professional footballer who plays for Ceará as a midfielder.

Club career
Born in Natal, Rio Grande do Norte, Richardson made his senior debut with Flamengo-SP in 2010. He went on to represent América-RN (in Série B),  Baraúnas and Confiança, before joining Treze on 2 June 2013, in Série C. He was released by the club on 13 August after failing to "meet the expectations of the board and also the supporter".

On 15 January 2014, Richardson moved to Operário-PR. On 4 April, he rejoined Confiança. In his first season, he won promotion to Série C and in the second season, he won Campeonato Sergipano with the club.

On 2 January 2016, Richardson joined Série B club Ceará on a one-year deal. On 5 July, his contract was extended until December 2019. He scored  his first league goal in a 1–1 draw against Joinville on 18 June 

During the 2017 season, Richardson played both as a right midfielder and a right back, with his side winning the 2017 Campeonato Cearense and achieving promotion to Série A. He went on to captain the side during the campaign in 2018.

On 14 January 2019, Richardson moved abroad and joined Japanese club Kashiwa Reysol.

Career statistics

References

External links

Richardson at Ceará website

1991 births
Living people
Association football midfielders
Brazilian footballers
J1 League players
J2 League players
Campeonato Brasileiro Série A players
Campeonato Brasileiro Série B players
Campeonato Brasileiro Série C players
Campeonato Brasileiro Série D players
Associação Atlética Flamengo players
América Futebol Clube (RN) players
Associação Desportiva Confiança players
Treze Futebol Clube players
Operário Ferroviário Esporte Clube players
Ceará Sporting Club players
Kashiwa Reysol players
People from Natal, Rio Grande do Norte
Sportspeople from Rio Grande do Norte